Chester Apy (March 8, 1932 – May 30, 2021) was an American Republican politician who served in the New Jersey General Assembly from District 5B from 1968 to 1970 and from 1972 to 1974. First elected in 1967 in District 5B with Joseph Azzolina, he did not stand for reelection in 1969. However, he ran again in 1971 and won a seat in the Assembly again serving another single term alongside Democrat Eugene J. Bedell.

Apy attended grammar school in Little Silver, Peddie School, Sherborne School (as an exchange student), and Princeton University, and earned an LL.B from Columbia University School of Law. A resident of Little Silver, he worked as an attorney and was a partner in a Red Bank law firm.

He died on May 30, 2021, in Red Bank, New Jersey at age 89.

References

1932 births
2021 deaths
Republican Party members of the New Jersey General Assembly
People from Red Bank, New Jersey
People from Little Silver, New Jersey
New Jersey lawyers
Peddie School alumni
People educated at Sherborne School
Princeton University alumni
Columbia Law School alumni